Otto Charles "Pep" Deininger (October 10, 1877 – September 25, 1950) was a pitcher/center fielder in Major League Baseball who played for two different teams between  and . Listed at  5' " Weight: 180 lb., Deininger batted and threw left-handed. He was born in Wasseralfingen, Germany.

Deininger started his majors career in 1902 as a pitcher for the Boston Americans. He posted a 9.75 ERA with two strikeouts and nine walks in two appearances, including one start, and did not have a decision. He later switched to the outfield, appearing in 56 games in part of two seasons with the Philadelphia Phillies (1908-1909).

In a three-season career, Deininger posted a .263 batting average (46-for-175) with 16 RBI and 22 runs, including 10 doubles, one triple, and five stolen bases without home runs.

Deininger died in Boston, Massachusetts, at age 72.

See also
List of players from Germany in Major League Baseball

References

External links

Retrosheet

Boston Americans players
Philadelphia Phillies players
Major League Baseball center fielders
Major League Baseball pitchers
Major League Baseball players from Germany
German emigrants to the United States
1877 births
1950 deaths
Haverhill Hustlers players
Altoona Mountaineers players
Jersey City Skeeters players
Rochester Bronchos players
Buffalo Bisons (minor league) players
Montreal Royals players
Syracuse Stars (minor league baseball) players
Bridgeport Hustlers players
Bridgeport Americans players
New London Planters players
Portland Duffs players